Woolley House is a heritage-listed residence located at 34 Bullecourt Avenue, Mosman, in the Mosman Council local government area of New South Wales, Australia. It was designed by Ken Woolley and built during 1962 by Pettit, Sevitt and Partners. It was added to the New South Wales State Heritage Register on 25 May 2001. The Woolley House is considered a classic example of the Sydney School style of architecture and was the recipient of the Australian Institute of Architects NSW Chapter Wilkinson Award in the year of its construction, the highest award for housing in New South Wales. In 2003 the house was bequeathed to the Historic Houses Trust of New South Wales.

History 
The block on which the Woolley House is built was a subdivision of the adjoining land at 11 Bickel Road, Mosman which was approved by Mosman Municipal Council on 26 August 1958. Another block north of the Woolley House's block (the current 34A Bullecourt Avenue) was similarly subdivided off 11 Bickell Road.

11 Bickell Road is an attractive verandahed two-storey Federation bungalow on a large sloping, sandstone terraced site which has been densely planted over much of the 20th century. In the 1950s this large garden won prizes. Late in the 20th century a swimming pool and tennis court replaced some of the lower garden near Bay Street. Jacaranda (J.mimosifolia), Sydney red gum (Angophora costata) and sweet gum (Liquidambar styraciflua) and dawn redwood (Metasequoia glyptostroboides) are among the mature trees on this site. The steeper section at the north/rear was more natural with some large Sydney red gums and regrowth on it. It is this latter section which was subdivided off to create the Woolley House's lot in 1958.

The Woolley House is an example of Ken Woolley's early work before joining Ancher, Mortlock and Murray in 1964. Woolley designed the State Office Block for the NSW Government Architect's Office, as well as Fisher Library at the University of Sydney.

At the time of the house's construction, Sydney had been developed to certain boundaries and most of the flat building sites had been exhausted. Developers therefore set their sights on land previously considered unfit for building (such as the steep bushland on which the Woolley House is built). A new house type that accepted that the land sloped was required for such sites. The split level form minimised the amount of excavation and filling that was required for construction.

This requirement led to amazingly spatially dynamic forms, space vertically through the interiors as well as horizontally. Internal spaces were staggered, a unique approach, and stepped down the sites so that sightlines could angle down and views could be achieved from remote areas of the house. Materials often used were quarry tiles, western red cedar boarding and panelling, clinker or sandstock bricks, polished timber floors, sawn and unfinished timbers. Colour schemes were typically neutral internally to allow the materials and spaces to speak for themselves.

Living spaces were generally open plan, connected but articulated by changes of ceiling height, changes of direction and screening with fittings or elements of the plan. The clever and complex manipulation of space meant that floor areas could be tight while maximising the feeling of space in the house. Visual separation was often achieved by arranging lines of sight to wholly or partially conceal some views (such as views of the kitchen from the living area). Decks and terraces which opened the interior to the exterior were common. Small bedrooms were generally chosen to allow living areas to be maximised.

This style of house became known as the Sydney School, and was used across Australia, but predominantly along the eastern seaboard, mainly around Sydney. This style offered charming and intimate spaces, beautifully crafted with naturally finished materials. It really only became possible at the end of the 1950s to use more interesting building materials as war time difficulties were at an end. Clinker bricks were imperfect and suited the aesthetic of the Sydney School, which was in part a revisiting of the Californian Bungalow aesthetic.

The design ideas were quite radical in one way, but the scale of the spaces and the palate of materials was very warm and human. The Woolley house and the other examples at the time were highly influential and affected the designs of many other contemporary houses, both one-off designs and, more directly, the project homes Ken Woolley went on to design for progressive housing developers, Pettit and Sevitt.

The stone retaining walls in the steep and undulating garden were laid by landscape architect Bruce McKenzie who also did some planting. McKenzie was a pioneer among early landscape practitioners of what would become known as the Sydney school, seeking to enhance Sydney's bush, bring it into gardens or bolster its condition in new development. He would go on to many large public jobs such as the UTS Lindfield / Ku-Ring-Gai campus (former Lindfield TAFE), Botany Bay Foreshore Reserve and others. Examples of McKenzie's private garden work are rare.

The current owners bought the house in 1985 and have retained the bush setting, encouraging regeneration of native species.

In 2014 a plaque was placed on the house, below its Wilkinson Award plaque, to commemorate former owner Yuana Hesketh who lived here from 1985 until 2014, created the garden as it now is and was devoted to the house's conservation. The owner has arranged to bequeath the property to the University of New South Wales to be used as a residence for visiting academics.

Description 
The basis of the Woolley House design was derived from a series of garden terraces, most of which were covered by sections of timber roof sloping parallel to the land. A geometric order was applied to the plan as a series of  units that combine to make up the main central space. Natural materials were exploited, with neutral colour schemes of dark tiles, western red cedar boarding and panelling, and painted bricks, creating a feeling of warmth in the house. The open plan living spaces were connected with volumes containing variations of ceiling height and changes in direction, enabling floor areas to be narrow but for the feeling of space to still be maximised.

Site
The house is located on a steep hillside, covered with large rocks, trees and ferns and that originally looked out over Middle Harbour. Now, almost 40 years after construction, the site's trees have grown and screen the view.

A key part of the heritage values of the Woolley House as a Sydney School house and garden is its sloping, bush covered, i.e.: treed site, and its informality, it appearing almost as if the house has been "dropped down into" a natural bush setting. To some degree the current natural appearance is the result of Woolley's neglect of the block and natural or bird-induced seed regeneration. To some degree it is due to sympathetic current owners having planted native species and nurtured a sympathetic "bush" setting, albeit with some exotic shade-loving plants such as Begonia spp.

The site is full of winding paths, small and some larger stone retaining walls. Some of these were built by landscape architect Bruce McKenzie, working with Woolley at the time of construction. These and some early plantings McKenzie made, are rare examples of a private job: McKenzie is better known for his large public projects (pers.comm., Ken Woolley; Stuart Read, 13/10/11).

House
The design derives from an idea of garden terraces, most of which are covered by sections of timber roof which slope parallel to the land.

A geometric discipline was imposed on the plan, the basis of the which is a series of  units, several of which combine to form the main central space. The main bedroom, bathroom and kitchen units open from this central space.

The individual units step sideways and downwards across the slope and the roof sections follow, creating narrow rooflights which serve to make the roof float over the living areas.

Each unit steps aside  (one third its width) to follow the contours of the land, and the same proportion is used to separate the units vertically.

The building's external walls, and several internal walls (which create screens and balustrades which divide the flowing interior) are of clinker brick. The palate of materials is kept to a minimum and was selected to define the individual elements of the structure and its infill. Internally, the structural frame of sawn hemlock is visible. Infill panels are of oiled tallowwood.

Ventilation is provided by the means of solid timber panels which have insect screens fitted externally. The concrete floors were originally covered with cork and matting. The cork remains, but the matting has been replaced with carpet.

Condition 

As at 3 January 2001, archaeological potential is low. The building and its garden setting are in excellent condition, having been carefully maintained by the current owners. The building is in near original condition and thus has a high degree of integrity.

Modifications and dates 
The building is in near original condition. All maintenance and repair works has been carried out in consultation with the original architect.

Wilkinson Award, 1962
The Woolley House was the recipient of the RAIA NSW Chapter Wilkinson Award in 1962, the highest award for housing in New South Wales. Wooley described the house as follows:

Heritage listing 

As at 1 June 2015, the Woolley House in its setting is an important early example of the work of Ken Woolley, one of Australia's leading architects since the early 1960s. It is an extremely important example of the "Sydney School" of architecture, using natural materials, stepping down a steeply sloping site. It became an important influence of later houses across Australia, but most particularly in Sydney. A key part of the aesthetic and historic heritage values of the Woolley House as a Sydney School house and garden is its sloping, bush covered, i.e.: treed site, and its informality, it appearing almost as if the house has been "dropped down into" a natural bush setting. Valuing such blocks and seeking to create "bush garden settings" was an integral part of this "School".

Woolley House was listed on the New South Wales State Heritage Register on 25 May 2001 having satisfied the following criteria.

The place is important in demonstrating the course, or pattern, of cultural or natural history in New South Wales.

The Woolley House is an early and classic example of the Sydney School, a movement which was emerging at the time of the building's construction.
The building has a strong association with Ken Woolley and is a very important example of his early work, demonstrating his young and idealistic vision. It is an example of Ken Woolley's early work before joining Ancher, Mortlock and Murray in 1964. The site is also a rare example of the garden design (private v public) of landscape architect Bruce McKenzie, a key practitioner in the Sydney School of landscape architecture of that era.

The place has a strong or special association with a person, or group of persons, of importance of cultural or natural history of New South Wales's history.

The site has strong associations with architect Ken Woolley and landscape architect Bruce McKenzie

The place is important in demonstrating aesthetic characteristics and/or a high degree of creative or technical achievement in New South Wales.

The house was a prototype that crystallised theories which were developing at the time. It was soon discovered that it was a style that could be mass-produced as it was modular, economic and honest in its use and expression of materials, in that it didn't rely on covering up the construction which made economic as well as aesthetic sense.

The place has potential to yield information that will contribute to an understanding of the cultural or natural history of New South Wales.

The Woolley House has a high degree of technical / research significance because of the fine-detailing and techniques used in its construction.

The place possesses uncommon, rare or endangered aspects of the cultural or natural history of New South Wales.

The house is one of a small group of "one off" designs for "Sydney School" houses by Ken Woolley. It is also a rare example of the private garden design and construction work of landscape architect Bruce McKenzie, better known for large public projects.

The place is important in demonstrating the principal characteristics of a class of cultural or natural places/environments in New South Wales.

The house is highly representative of the Sydney School in domestic architecture and landscape architecture, popular during the 1960s and 1970s.

Ken Woolley (1933–2015)
Ken Woolley died in late 2015. His designs for the University of Sydney's Chemistry School and St. Margaret's Hospital chapel, done when he was 22, are heritage-listed. Before he was 30 he had completed a number of famous Sydney buildings, including the University of Sydney's Fisher Library, the State Office Block on the corner of Macquarie and Bent Streets (demolished in 1997 for Aurora Place), the Woolley House in Mosman, the Lidcombe Hospital Recreation Hall and Chapel and the first Pettit & Sevitt project home houses. Woolley went to University of Sydney through a traineeship from the NSW Public Works Department that paid the fees and an allowance, with holiday employment and a five-year contract after graduation. He graduated in 1955 with first class honours in architecture and the University Medal. He was awarded the Byera Hadley Travelling Scholarship for 1955, working in London for Chamberlin Powell and Bon, in the midst of discussion about modernism and the International style. The Smithsons, New Brutalism and New Liberty styles were part of this discourse. He travelled to Finland in the north, Italy and Spain in the south, visiting prominent architects and buildings of the day.

In 1964 Woolley went into partnership with Ancher Mortlock Murray, and on to a career including over 6,000 dwelling units and production houses and his own three Wilkinson Award-winning homes. The early years of the practice saw the individual partners doing their own thing, but with time and retirements Woolley became sole principal and design director of Ancher Mortlock Woolley in 1982 and from then on much of the firm's work carried his stamp. He saw himself as a late modernist, invludenced in various ways by Alvar Aalto, Mies van der Rohe and Le Corbusier and attuned to the development of regionalism, New Brutalism, the theoretical aspects of post-modernism and reattachment to traditions.

His works in the Australian Embassy in Bangkok, Parramatta Federal Courts, the ADFA Cadets' Mess, several student union buildings on universities, wharf-side Navy buildings of Garden Island, the Park Hyatt Hotel, Sydney Town Hall House and Sydney Square (between the Town Hall and St. Andrew's Cathedral), the ABC Radio and Goossens Hall – first section of the ABC's Ultimo headquarters, Australia's pavilion at Expo '88, the State Library of Victoria (extension), the Olympics 2000 sports halls, the Agricultural Society Dome and the Hockey Stadium at Homebush Bay and Sydney Airport Control Tower. He designed the new Large Theatre at Sydney Opera House.

In the 21st century came the latest refurbishment of the Queen Victoria Building, an effort at revival of the Pettit & Sevitt houses and other collaborative projects with his former practice, Ancher Mortlock Woolley. He was a visiting professor at University of NSW and University of Sydney and chaired or was a member on various award, review and competition juries. Woolley was interested in architectural theory and was working on a book, "People in Glass Houses" about the key point in Modernist architecture, around 1930, when he died.

Woolley was appointed a member of the Order of Australia (AM) in 1988, awarded the Gold Medal of the Royal Australian Institute of Architects in 1993 and elected a fellow of the Academy of Technological Sciences and Engineering in 2001. He received the Centenary Medal in 2003 for services to structural engineering. In 2010 he was awarded a Doctorate of Science in Architecture honoris causa by the University of Sydney, where he was an adjunct professor of the Faculty of Architecture, Design and Planning.

See also 

Australian residential architectural styles
List of heritage houses in Sydney

References

Bibliography

Attribution

External links

Sydney Architecture

Houses in Sydney
Houses completed in 1962
Mosman, New South Wales
New South Wales State Heritage Register
Articles incorporating text from the New South Wales State Heritage Register